Draper is an unincorporated community in northern Alberta, Canada within the Regional Municipality (R.M.) of Wood Buffalo. The community consists mainly of acreages.

History 
Draper was founded in 1922 and named for Thomas Draper, who operated a quarry in the area and established the McMurray Asphaltum and Oil Company. It has been affected as part of the 2016 Fort McMurray Wildfire, and the damage in Draper itself is being assessed.

Demographics 
The population of Draper in 2012 was 197 according to a municipal census conducted by the R.M of Wood Buffalo.

See also 
List of communities in Alberta

References

External links 
Regional Municipality of Wood Buffalo

Localities in the Regional Municipality of Wood Buffalo